This is a list of people associated with RWTH Aachen University in Germany.

Leibniz Prize Awardees
  – foundry science 1986
 Norbert Peters – combustion engineering 1990
 Dieter Enders – organic chemistry 1993
 Siegfried Bethke – elementary particle physics 1995
  – process engineering 2001
 Wolfgang Dahmen – mathematics 2002
  – mathematics 2003
  – material science 2004
 Martin Beneke – theoretical particle physics 2008
 Leif Kobbelt – computer graphics and multimedia 2013
 Rainer Waser –  material science and nanoelectronics 2013

Scientists

Engineering science
 Bodo von Borries – professor of electrical engineering; co-inventor of the electron microscope
Ulrich Lemmer – professor of electrical engineering and optoelectronics
 Philipp Forchheimer (1852–1933) – civil engineering
  – professor of hydraulic engineering
 Christoph Ingenhoven - architect
 Hugo Junkers - aviation engineer and manufacturer (1883), International Air & Space Hall of Fame (1976)
 Theodore von Kármán – pioneer of modern aerodynamics
 Bernd Lottermoser – director of the Institute of Mineral Resources Engineering
  – former leader of an institute for plastics engineering; creator of Georg-Menges Prize
  – professor of machine tools and production engineering
 Karl-Heinz Petzinka – architect and Rector of the Kunstakademie Düsseldorf
 Jesco von Puttkamer – rocket engineer; space exploration technology
 August Ritter – professor of mechanics and astrophysics
 B. J. Habibie – Theodhore van Karman Award from International Council for Aeronautical Sciences; honorary member of Gesellschaft Fuer Luft Und Raumfahrt (West Germany); Vice President and Director of Technology at MBB Hamburg; Senior Advisor for Technology on the Board of Directors of MBB – Hamburg
  – professor of internal combustion engines
 Helena Amélia Oehler Stemmer Brazilian civil engineer & university professor. 
 Rolf Göpfert – architect
 Y. B. Mangunwijaya – Indonesian architect and novelist
 Bernhard Walke – professor of electrical engineering

Natural sciences and medicine
 Hans Günther Aach – botanist, former director of the Botanical Institute
 Wil van der Aalst — computer scientist
 Friedrich Asinger – chemist, former director of the Institute for Technical and Petrol Chemistry
 Otto Blumenthal – mathematician
 Martin Bojowald – physicist
  – Director of the Max-Planck Institute for Plasma Physics
Julius Bredt – organic chemist, discovered the Bredt's rule
 Herbert Capellmann – theoretical physicist
 Wolfgang Dahmen – mathematician
  – physicist, recipient of the Walter Schottky award
  – theoretical physicist
  – experimental physicist
 Friedrich Robert Helmert – mathematician and geodesist
 Ludwig Hopf – mathematician and theoretical physicist
 Wilhelm Keim – chemist, former director of the Institute for Technical and Petrol Chemistry
 Christian Haug – physician, psychiatrist
 Stefan Kuetter – physician, general practitioner
 Martin Kutta – mathematician
 Otto Lehmann – father of liquid crystal research
Maria Lipp – organic chemist, first female doctoral student, and professor at the RWTH Aachen University
 Hans von Mangoldt – mathematician
 Josef Meixner – physicist 
  – physicist, now CEO of the Max-Planck Institute for Solid State Research
  – mathematician
  – mathematician
  – Director of the Max-Planck Institute for Iron Research
 - experimental physicist
  – theoretical physicist
  – physicist
 Rudolf Schulten (1923–1996) – physicist and father of the Pebble bed reactor
 Jan Schroers — physicist 
 Walter Selke – theoretical physicist
 Arnold Sommerfeld – professor of applied mathematics, 1900–1906. Famous physicist
 Arne Stahl – physicist
  – theoretical physicist
 Dieter Vollhardt – physicist, recipient of the Max-Planck medal
  – experimental physicist
 Ranga Yogeshwar – physicist and science journalist
 Lu Yongxiang – President of the Chinese Academy of Sciences
 Helmut Zahn – chemist; first synthesis of insulin

Humanities
  – philosopher
 August von Brandis – artist
 Arnold Gehlen – sociologist
  – Germanist and linguist
  – psychological assessment, organizational psychology
 Klaus Mehnert – journalist and professor of political science
  (1942–1992) – historian for old buildings and fortresses
 Pia Lamberty – social psychologist and co-founder of the Center for Monitoring, Analysis and Strategy

Politicians and public figures

Politicians

 Ulrich Daldrup – Professor of International Law; former Mayor of the City of Aachen
 Necmettin Erbakan – former Turkish Prime minister
 B. J. Habibie – President of Indonesia (1998–1999)
 Ulla Schmidt – politician, Federal minister
 Noureddin Kianouri (Codename: Silvio Macetti) (1933–1939) Iranian architect, urban planner, and Communist Political Leader
 Rangin Dadfar Spanta – Afghanistan Secretary of State (since March 2006)
 Ena von Baer – Chilean journalist, politician; ministry of Segegob (March 2010 – July 2011); designated Senator (July 2011 to date)
Hellmuth Greinert  – Chief City Director of the City of Essen (1950  – 1957)
Saruhan Oluç  – politician of the Peoples' Democratic Party (HDP) in Turkey

Public figures

  – TV journalist
  – President of the Green Cross Corporation, RWTH-Honorary senator
 Andreas Jiman – IT Consultant for Indonesian National Police, National Crime Information Center
 Arno Joentgen – magician
 Hugo Junkers – industrialist and academic 
 Karlheinz Kaske – CEO of Siemens AG (1982–1991)
  – entrepreneur, founder of 
 Jürgen von der Lippe – comedian
 Sonia Mikich – TV correspondent and top editor
 Franz-Josef Paefgen – CEO of Bentley Motors; former CEO of Audi AG

 Kemal Şahin – Turkish entrepreneur (Şahinler Group)
 Hans Wilhelm Schlegel – astronaut
 Christoph Schmallenbach – CEO of AMB Generali
 Hans Ernst Schneider/Hans Schwerte – Rector of RWTH under fake name (1970–1973); identified as a former SS member, and all his rights were revoked
  – former CEO of Infineon (2000–2004)
 Mario Theissen – boss of BMW's Formula One racing division
 Wendelin Wiedeking – former CEO of Porsche; member in the supervisory board of Volkswagen

RWTH Aachen University
RWTH Aachen, List of